"Cover Me" is a song by Depeche Mode, released on October 6, 2017, via Columbia label. It is the third single from their fourteenth studio album, Spirit. The released single consists of several remixes of songs "Cover Me" and "So Much Love". It is the fourth single in the band's catalog that is co-written by lead singer Dave Gahan. It is the last single to feature Andy Fletcher before his death in 2022.

Background 
"Cover Me" was one of four songs Dave Gahan co-wrote. "Cover Me" also ended up being one of the most cinematic compositions on Spirit. According to an interview with keyboard programmer Matrixxman, working on "Cover Me" was initially difficult but Gahan inspired everyone to get very creative on that track.  Gahan also stated in a video on their YouTube channel that he always envisioned the song as having two halves, a lyrical first half and a more spacious instrumental based second half. 

Depeche Mode uploaded a live version of "Cover Me" to their YouTube channel days before the official release of the LiVE SPiRiTS SOUNDTRACK on 22 June 2020.

Track listing

Personnel 
Band
 David Gahan – lead vocals
 Martin Gore – guitar, keyboards, synthesizers, backing vocals
 Andrew Fletcher – keyboards, synthesizers, backing vocals
 James Ford – drums, pedal steel guitar, mixing, producing
 Kurt Uenala – programming 
 Matrixxman – programming

Production
 Jimmy Robertson – engineering 
 Brendan Morawski – technician 
 Anton Corbijn – artwork, design
 David Bett – design

Charts

References

External links

2017 singles
Depeche Mode songs
Song recordings produced by James Ford (musician)
2017 songs
Columbia Records singles
Black-and-white music videos
Music videos directed by Anton Corbijn
Songs written by Dave Gahan
Songs written by Peter Gordeno (musician)